Jan Magnus Cato (born 30 June 1967) is a Swedish handball player who competed in the 1992 Summer Olympics.

He was born in Gothenburg.

In 1992 he was a member of the Swedish handball team which won the silver medal. He played six matches and scored six goal.

External links
profile

1967 births
Living people
Handball players from Gothenburg
Swedish male handball players
Olympic handball players of Sweden
Handball players at the 1992 Summer Olympics
Olympic silver medalists for Sweden
Olympic medalists in handball
Medalists at the 1992 Summer Olympics
20th-century Swedish people
21st-century Swedish people